This list of exoplanets discovered in 2020 is a list of confirmed exoplanets that were first observed in 2020.

For exoplanets detected only by radial velocity, the listed value for mass is a lower limit. See Minimum mass for more information.

Specific exoplanet lists

References
http://exoplanet.eu/catalog/
https://exoplanetarchive.ipac.caltech.edu/overview/

2020

exoplanets